Lukas Graham is a Danish pop band consisting of lead vocalist and multi-instrumentalist Lukas Forchhammer, bassist Magnus Larsson, and drummer Mark Falgren. The band released their first album, Lukas Graham, with labels Copenhagen Records and Then We Take The World in 2012. The album peaked at number one on the Danish charts. Their second album was released in 2015 and earned international attention with singles like "Mama Said" and "7 Years", the latter of which topped the singles charts in many major music markets. The self-titled international debut album was officially released in the United States by Warner Bros. Records on 1 April 2016.

Career

2011–2012: Career beginnings
The band formed in Denmark in 2011 and initially uploaded homemade videos of the songs "Drunk in the Morning" and "Criminal Mind". The songs were also shared on Facebook and accrued several hundred thousand views. The band signed a record deal in late 2011 with the Danish record label Copenhagen Records which is owned by Universal Music Denmark. In a later interview, Lukas Graham has revealed that the band already had a contract with Copenhagen Records and the self-made videos were the label's idea to create an underground buzz.

Prior to officially releasing any music, the band had sold 17,000 tickets for an upcoming tour.
 
Their first release, available only in Europe and selected other nations, became certified five-times platinum in Denmark. Their first release also featured four charting songs such as "Drunk in the Morning", "Better Than Yourself (Criminal Mind Pt 2)" and "Ordinary Things". Over the course of 2012, Lukas Graham played 107 concerts throughout Europe, selling 40,000 tickets in Denmark alone. They sold 80,000 albums and 150,000 singles while also earning 5 million YouTube views and 27 million streams. Their tour took them across Europe to countries like England, Netherlands, Norway, Sweden, Germany, Austria, France, and Spain.

2013–2014: Continued touring and Warner Bros. Records deal
In 2013, the band continued to tour throughout Europe. In the summer of 2013, the band was added to the bill of the Grøn Koncert (Green Concert) tour which is held in support of muscular dystrophy research. In October 2013, Lukas Graham won the European Border Breakers Award (EBBA) for their international tours in Europe.
 
In the fall of 2013, the band signed to Warner Bros. Records. The record company signed them with the intent of bringing their music to the United States. Starting in early 2014, the band spent extended periods of time in Los Angeles writing and recording what would become their official U.S. debut. The band is still represented by Copenhagen Records in the Nordics, Germany, Switzerland, Austria, and France and is managed by Then We Take The World. In March 2014, Forchhammer himself contributed vocals to Hedegaard's Danish number-one single "Happy Home". Later in 2014, the band released their first single, "Mama Said", off their upcoming album.

2015–present: Worldwide debut, "7 Years" and international success
The band released their next record (often referred to as the "Blue Album") on Copenhagen Records and Then We Take The World solely in Denmark and several other mostly European nations in 2015. It peaked at number one in Denmark and made it onto several other Euro charts. It featured the singles "Mama Said", "Strip No More" and "7 Years", the last of which peaked at number one on the charts for Denmark, Italy, Austria, Belgium, and Sweden. The band made their United States television debut performing "7 Years" on a 10 December 2015 episode of Conan and the song peaked at number two on the Billboard Hot 100 list. In March 2016, Lukas Graham performed "7 Years" on Jimmy Kimmel Live!. The band has also performed the song on Late Night with Seth Meyers, The Ellen DeGeneres Show, The Late Late Show with James Corden, and Good Morning America.
 
By the end of March 2016, "7 Years" had achieved around 225 million total listens on Spotify worldwide with 17.2 million listeners per month, making the band the 20th most popular artist on the service. On 1 April 2016, the self-titled international debut was officially released in the United States by Warner Bros. Records. The US release of the album received new artwork, a reworked track listing, and a wider worldwide audience in countries including, Canada, Australia, the United Kingdom, and New Zealand. The album reached No. 3 on the Billboard 200, No. 2 in the UK and New Zealand, No. 1 in Australia and Canada, and No. 5 in Ireland. The band also embarked on a two-month long tour throughout the United States and Canada at the end of March 2016. Most dates on the tour sold out. As of November 2021, "7 Years" has over 1.32 billion Spotify streams.
 
In June 2016, keyboardist Kasper Daugaard left the band as "touring life wasn't right for (him)". He was temporarily replaced by the band's producer and former keyboardist, Morten Ristorp.
 
In December 2016, Lukas Graham was nominated for three Grammy Awards including Record of the Year and Song of the Year for "7 Years" and Best Pop Duo/Group Performance. 7 Year was also nominated for Song of the Year at the 2016 BBC Music Awards where the band performed the song live on 12 December 2016.

In 2017, Lukas Graham performed the song "Off to See the World", featured on the soundtrack of My Little Pony: The Movie.

In September 2018, the band announced their third album 3 (The Purple Album), to be released on 26 October 2018 through Warner Bros. Records, and its lead single "Love Someone".

On 20 February 2019, Lukas Graham performed as a guest artist on the third season of I Can See Your Voice Thailand.

On 8 April 2019, Lukas Graham performed as a guest artist on the seventeenth season of American Idol during the second night of the "Top 20 Duets" episode. Forchhammer sang with contestants Eddie Island and Dimitrius Graham; both of which moved forward to the Top 14.

Musical style
Lukas Graham's music has been described as a pop-soul hybrid. In a review of the band's new album, journalist Jon Pareles of The New York Times described their sound as the place "where pop meets R&B". Patrick Ryan of USA Today wrote that the band's songs "effortlessly blend elements of hip hop and folk". Lyrically, the songs often deal with relatable experiences like growing up poor ("Mama Said") or drinking ("Drunk in the Morning"). The band's most popular song, "7 Years", describes growing up and aging at specific points in life (from seven years old to 60).
 
Forchhammer grew up in a self-governing artistic community in the middle of Copenhagen called Christiania. The area is known for its creative atmosphere, relative poverty and crime. His experiences growing up in the community have shaped both the sound of his music and the lyrics he writes.

Band members

Current members
Lukas Forchhammer – lead vocals ; piano, keyboards ; guitar, bass, percussion, backing vocals 
Mark "Lovestick" Falgren – drums, percussion, backing vocals 
Magnus Larsson – bass, backing vocals 

Former members
Anders Kirk – piano, keyboards 
Morten Ristorp – piano, keyboards 
Kasper Daugaard – piano, keyboards, backing vocals 

The Rusty Trombones
Lars Vissing – trumpet 
Nikolai Bøgelund – trombone 
Thomas Edinger – saxophone 

Other touring musicians
Will Herrington – piano, keyboards, backing vocals 
Jon Sosin – guitar 
Emil Falk – guitar 
Henrik Møller – bass 
Andreas Lund – guitar 
David Maemone – piano, keyboards 
Andreas Stigkær – piano, keyboards 

Timeline

Discography

 Lukas Graham (2012)
 Blue Album (2015)
 3 (The Purple Album) (2018)
 4 (The Pink Album) (2023)

Awards and nominations

References

External links

 
 
 

 
2011 establishments in Denmark
Danish pop music groups
Musical groups established in 2011
Musical quartets
Danish musical trios
Warner Records artists